Villegats may refer to the following places in France:

 Villegats, Charente, a commune in the Charente department
 Villegats, Eure, a commune in the Eure department